"Hell and High Water" is the second promo single from Black Stone Cherry's self-titled debut Black Stone Cherry. It follows the first successful single "Lonely Train". This song reached #30 on the Mainstream Rock Tracks chart. It was supported by a video directed by JB Carlin.

"Hell and High Water" is a digital-only three-track EP released on iTunes. It contains three tracks from the self-titled album.

Track listing 
 "Hell and High Water" – 4:02
 "Big City Lights" – 4:23
 "We Are the Kings" – 3:57

References 

2006 songs
2006 singles
Black Stone Cherry songs
Roadrunner Records singles